Facundo Gabriel Coria (born 28 May 1987) is an Argentine footballer who plays for Italian club Casarano.

Career
Coria made his league debut on 18 February 2007 for Vélez Sársfield in a 2–2 draw with Racing Club. Since then he has had several loan spells with other clubs. He joined Arsenal de Sarandí in 2008, CS Emelec of Ecuador in 2009 and Argentinos Juniors between 2009 and 2010.

While at Argentinos he was an important member of the team that won the Clausura 2010 championship, having played in 16 of the club's 19 games and scored four goals during the championship winning campaign. Coria scored the decisive goal in Argentinos Juniors' 2–1 away win against Huracán on the last day of the season to secure the championship ahead of title rivals Estudiantes.

Coria joined Villarreal B on July 1, 2010 for a $846k transfer price. Coria was loaned to CF Pachuca in early 2011 and returned in June after making 6 appearances.

On July 1, 2011, Coria signed with Estudiantes. 

Coria joined Chilean team, Colo-Colo in a free transfer on June 25, 2012.

On August 5, 2013, Coria returned to Argentina, joining the Argentinos Juniors.

Coria signed with D.C. United on May 18, 2015. During his time with DC he played 7 games and recorded one assist. His contract was waived on December 7, 2015.

After being left without a club, Coria joined Quilmes on August 9, 2016.

Coria joined Sportivo Estudiantes on September 19, 2017.

On January 1, 2019, Coria joined Venezuelan side, Monagas SC.

Coria joined Italian Serie D club FC Messina on August 29, 2019.

He left FC Messina in August 2021 to join another Serie D club, Casarano.

Honours

Club
Arsenal de Sarandí
 Suruga Bank Cup (1): 2008

Argentinos Juniors
 Torneo de Clausura (1): 2010

References

External links
 Coria at Football-Lineups.com
 Facundo Gabriel Coria – Argentine Primera statistics at Fútbol XXI 
 
 
 Facundo Coria at Footballdatabase

1987 births
Living people
Footballers from Buenos Aires
Argentine footballers
Argentine expatriate footballers
Club Atlético Vélez Sarsfield footballers
Arsenal de Sarandí footballers
Argentinos Juniors footballers
Estudiantes de La Plata footballers
C.S. Emelec footballers
Villarreal CF B players
C.F. Pachuca players
Colo-Colo footballers
D.C. United players
Quilmes Atlético Club footballers
Monagas S.C. players
Club Sportivo Estudiantes players
S.S.D. F.C. Messina players
Chilean Primera División players
Argentine Primera División players
Primera Nacional players
Liga MX players
Major League Soccer players
Ecuadorian Serie A players
Segunda División players
Venezuelan Primera División players
Argentine expatriate sportspeople in Chile
Argentine expatriate sportspeople in Ecuador
Argentine expatriate sportspeople in Mexico
Argentine expatriate sportspeople in Spain
Argentine expatriate sportspeople in Venezuela
Argentine expatriate sportspeople in Italy
Expatriate footballers in Chile
Expatriate footballers in Ecuador
Expatriate footballers in Mexico
Expatriate footballers in Spain
Expatriate footballers in Venezuela
Expatriate footballers in Italy
Association football midfielders